Haskell Township is a township in Haskell County, Kansas, USA.  As of the 2000 census, its population was 1,971.

Geography
According to the USGS, it contains two cemeteries: Haskell and Ivanhoe.

Transportation
Haskell Township contains two airports or landing strips: Currey Farms Airport and Sublette Flying Club Land Strip.

References
 USGS Geographic Names Information System (GNIS)

External links
 US-Counties.com
 City-Data.com

Townships in Haskell County, Kansas
Townships in Kansas